Martin Luther King Jr. Senior High School is a public magnet high school located at 3200 East Lafayette Boulevard in Detroit, Michigan; the building is operated by the Detroit Board of Education. King's district encompasses Downtown and Midtown Detroit; it also includes Lafayette Park, the Martin Luther King Apartments and Riverfront Condominiums. The Brewster-Douglass Housing Projects were zoned to MLK prior to their demolition. In addition it includes the three Wayne State University housing complexes that permit families with children (Chatsworth Tower, DeRoy, and University Tower).

History
Martin Luther King Jr. Senior High School was originally named Eastern High School. The first school building for Eastern opened in 1901 at the intersection of Mack Avenue and East Grand Boulevard.

In the fall of 1967 Eastern moved to a new building on East Lafayette and Mount Elliott, and one year later was renamed Martin Luther King Jr. Senior High School, after the civil rights leader's assassination in April 1968. The mascot name was changed at the same time from the Indians to the Crusaders. The original Eastern High building was demolished in 1982.

In 2009, Detroit Public Schools became the beneficiary of a $500.5 million, voter-approved federal bond package. At almost $53 million, the MLK project was one of the largest components of the package. The redeveloped Martin Luther King Jr. Senior High School re-opened in September 2011, with almost 200,000 square feet of new space, and 47,000 square feet of altered and redeveloped space. The project turned the facility into a school that emphasized a science, technology, engineering and mathematics (STEM) curriculum.

In 2012 Kettering High School closed, and some students were rezoned to King.

In 2017, King was one of several Detroit schools marked for closure by the State of Michigan due to the school's poor academic performance from 2014 to 2016. An agreement between the Michigan State Department of Education and the Detroit Board of Education saved the school from closure.

Extracurricular activities

Athletics
In 34 seasons (1984 to 2017), under Coach William Winfield, Jr., the Crusaders women's basketball program compiled 693 wins, appeared in eleven Michigan High School Athletic Association championship finals (1985, 1986, 1990, 1991, 1993, 1994, 2000, 2003, 2004, 2005, 2006, and 2016), winning the championship in 1985, 1990, 1991, 2003 and 2006. Coach Winfield retired in 2018 due to illness, and died age 78 on March 13, 2021.

In 2007, under Coach Jim Reynolds, the Crusaders football team became the first team from the Detroit Public Secondary Schools Athletic League to win a MHSAA Football Championship. From 1989 to 2019, the King Crusaders appeared in seven Michigan High School Athletic Association championship games in four different divisions (1989(A), 1990(AA), 2007(2), 2015(2), 2016(2), 2018(3), and 2019(2)), winning the championship in 2007, 2015, 2016, and 2018.

In 2006, King won the Detroit City League championship trophy in men's swimming and diving.

In 2008, the King High School marching band raised over $400,000 (including a sponsorship from U.S. Senator Hillary Clinton) to perform at the Summer Olympic Games in Beijing.

Notable alumni
 Anthony Adams (1998) former NFL defensive tackle
 Joe Altobelli (1950) All-City multi-sport Eastern athlete; former Major League Baseball player and manager; managed the 1983 World Series champion Baltimore Orioles
 Roy Banks (1983), professional football running back who played two seasons in the NFL.
 John "Frenchy" Fuqua (1965) professional football running back who played eight seasons in the NFL. Fuqua become part of NFL lore as the intended receiver for quarterback Terry Bradshaw's pass that sports historians refer to as the Immaculate Reception.
 Sauce Gardner (2018), American football player
 Derrick Gervin (1981), former NBA basketball player, 1995 Israeli Basketball Premier League MVP
 George Gervin (1970) former professional basketball player and member of Basketball Hall of Fame; in 1997, was voted one of NBA's 50 Greatest Players
 Joe Girard, author
 Chris Greenwood (2007), former NFL cornerback
 Reggie Harding (1961) first-team Parade Magazine All-American in 1961; led Eastern to three consecutive Detroit Public School League basketball championships; three-time All-State selection, drafted out of high school by Detroit Pistons; played four seasons in the NBA
 Rod Hill (1977) former professional football player in the NFL and CFL
 Ron Johnson (1998), former NFL wide receiver for two seasons with the Baltimore Ravens
 Ron LeFlore, Major League Baseball player for Detroit Tigers, two-time stolen-base champion in 1978 and 1980 (did not play baseball for high school or graduate)
 Avonte Maddox (2014), cornerback for NFL's Philadelphia Eagles
 Gerald McBurrows (1992), former NFL safety
 Kerwin Moore (1989), former MLB player
 Nick Perry (2008), linebacker for NFL's Green Bay Packers
 Jamar Pinkney Jr., murder victim
 Karon Riley (1996), former NFL linebacker
 Ernest Shazor (2001), former NFL safety
 Lou Scott (1963), one of America's top distance runners in 1960s, participating in the 1967 Pan American Games and the 1968 Summer Olympics.
 Emanuel Steward (1962) boxing trainer who trained world champions Thomas Hearns, Hilmer Kenty, Lennox Lewis and others. International Boxing Hall of Fame 1996 inductee.
 Mike Taylor, former NFL linebacker
 Helen Thomas (1937), journalist
 Kevin Vickerson (2001), former NFL defensive tackle
 Ken Woodard (1978), former NFL linebacker
 Bill Yearby (1962), 1962 state champion in the shot put, and All-American football player at the University of Michigan. New York Jets 1966 first round draft pick.
 Coleman A. Young (1934), first served in State House of Representatives, later becoming a Michigan State Senator; Mayor of Detroit from 1974 to 1994, the first African-American; outspoken person who lobbied at all levels for City of Detroit

References and notes

Educational institutions established in 1901
Public high schools in Michigan
High schools in Detroit
1901 establishments in Michigan
School buildings completed in 1901
School buildings completed in 1967
Detroit Public Schools Community District